Lauren Williams (born 25 February 1999) is a British taekwondo athlete who represents Great Britain. Williams won her third consecutive  European championship Gold medal in 2019 in Bari, Italy. She holds these titles in the -67 kg weight category. 2014/2016 Williams won the Junior World championships consecutively. In December 2018, Williams won the Grand Slam Series held in Wuxi China. Williams has 2 Gold medals from the Grand Prix Series with multiple podium finishes.

She qualified a Quota place for Great Britain at the Tokyo 2020 Olympic Games through Top 5 Ranking Automatic qualification, and won the silver medal in the -67 kg weight category, after losing the final to Matea Jelić.

References 
 Lauren Williams used to be a kick boxer but her occupation changed to a Taekwondo athlete as part of the GBR team

External links

 

1999 births
Living people
Welsh female taekwondo practitioners
People from Blackwood, Caerphilly
Sportspeople from Caerphilly County Borough
European Taekwondo Championships medalists
Olympic medalists in taekwondo
Taekwondo practitioners at the 2020 Summer Olympics
Medalists at the 2020 Summer Olympics
Olympic silver medallists for Great Britain
Sportspeople from Caerphilly
Olympic taekwondo practitioners of Great Britain
21st-century British women